Wang Chunyu (born April 7, 1997), better known as Ame, is a Chinese professional Dota 2 player for PSG.LGD.

Career
Ame started his Dota 2 career by joining the youth squad of CDEC Gaming, the following year he moved to LGD Gaming. They would go on to their first tier 1 tournament win at Mars Dota 2 League 2017 followed by a 4th place finish at The International 2017.

2018–2019
Throughout 2018, Ame and his team had multiple tournament wins
and were considered one of the favourites for winning TI8, eventually they lost to OG in the grandfinals in 5 games, followed by a 3rd place finish at TI9 next year.

2020–2021
After TI9, Ame was moved back to CDEC Gaming, which was also owned by PSG.LGD. On September 16, 2020, a new PSG.LGD roster was formed with Ame returning to PSG.LGD along with players from EHOME. This new roster would go on to dominate the season, and after winning the AniMajor along with a 3rd place finish at the Singapore Major, the team secured a direct invite to The International 2021.

Coming into the tournament, PSG.LGD were considered the heavy favourites for winning the tournament and had an impressive run dropping only 2 games. In the final, they eventually lost to Team Spirit 2–3.

Notable accomplishments

References

Living people
1997 births